Ahmad Kalzi (born January 28, 1987) is a Syrian football player who is currently playing for Al-Jaish in the Syrian Premier League.

References

External links
 

1987 births
Living people
Syrian footballers
Association football forwards
Al-Jaish Damascus players
Sportspeople from Aleppo
Syrian Premier League players